Secret Story - Casa dos Segredos 5 is the fifth season of the Portuguese reality television show Secret Story. It is based on the French version of Secret Story, which itself is based on the international format, Big Brother. The reality show is being broadcast on TVI. The casting were opened on June 11, 2014. The launch was on September 21, 2014. The finale was on December 31, 2014, and Elisabete was the winner. This was the first time a woman won a normal edition of Portuguese Secret Story.

Housemates

Agnes 
Agnes Arabela Marques is 30, was born in Romania and lives in Cascais. She entered the house on Day 1. She finished as the runner up on Day 102.
 Secret: "I was kidnapped and exploited by a cult"

Bruno 
Bruno Savate️️ is 29 and comes from Rio Tinto. He entered the house on Day 1. He finished third on Day 102.
 Secret: "My girlfriend and my two exes are in the House"

Célia 
Célia Mota is 22 and comes from São Miguel. She entered the house on Day 1 and quit for personal reasons on Day 3.
 Secret: "I have an obsessive compulsive disorder"

Cinthia 
Cinthia Camargos is 27, was born in Brazil and lives in Vila Franca de Xira. She entered the house on Day 1 and was evicted on Day 57.
 Secret: "I'm pregnant"

Cristiana 
Cristiana Dionísio is 22 and comes from Seixal. She entered the house on Day 1 and was evicted on Day 96.
 Secret: "I was involved with football players from three different countries"

Daniel 
Daniel Gregório is 19 and comes from Oeiras. He entered the house on Day 1 and was evicted on Day 92.
 Secret: "I'm a private detective"

Daniela 
Daniela Duarte is 23 and comes from Olhão. She entered the Secret Room on Day 1, entered the House on Day 3 and was evicted on Day 71.
 Secret: "We're a fake lesbian couple" (with Elisabete)

Elisabete 
Elisabete Moutinho is 23 and comes from Felgueiras. She entered the Secret Room on Day 1 and entered the House on Day 3. She finished as the winner of the series on Day 102.
 Secret: "We're a fake lesbian couple" (with Daniela)

Fernando 
Fernando Pereira is 25 and comes from Santo Tirso. He entered the house on Day 1 and was evicted on Day 78.
 Secret: "My girlfriend left me for a person of the same sex"

Flávia 
Flávia Vieira is 19 and comes from Rio Tinto. She entered the house on Day 1. She finished fifth on Day 102.
 Secret: "The great love of my life is in the House"

Hugo 
Hugo Miranda is 26 and comes from Lisbon. He entered the house on Day 1 and was evicted on Day 50.
 Secret: "I have entered the house with my father"

Inês 
Inês Silva is 20 and comes from Matosinhos. She entered the house on Day 1 and was evicted on Day 29.
 Secret: "The two exes of my boyfriend are in the House"

Liliana 
Liliana Antunes is 20 and comes from Sesimbra. She entered the house on Day 1 and was evicted on Day 85.
 Secret: "I can predict the future"

Luís C. 
Luís Catarino is 23 and comes from Sintra. He entered the house on Day 1 and was evicted on Day 15.
 Secret: "I'm the secret agent of the app"

Luís M. 
Luís Mendes is 45 and comes from Vila Franca de Xira. He entered the house on Day 1 and was evicted on Day 36.
 Secret: "My wife is in the House"

Odin 
Odin Kreuwitchz is 21 and comes from Coimbra. He entered the house on Day 1 and was evicted on Day 64.
 Secret: "I've a fetish for Teresa Guilherme"

Paulo 
Paulo Miranda is 44 and comes from Sintra. He entered the house on Day 1 and was evicted on Day 22.
 Secret: "I have entered the house with my son"

Pedro 
Pedro Infante is 28 and comes from Vila Viçosa. He entered the house on Day 1. He finished fourth on Day 102.
 Secret: "I suffer from a clowns phobia"

Ricardo 
Ricardo Areal is 23 and comes from Paris. He entered the house on Day 1 and was evicted on Day 71.
 Secret: "I have already been dead"

Sofiya 
Sofiya Muzychak is 20, was born in Ukraine and lives in Porto. She entered the house on Day 1 and was evicted on Day 8
 Secret: "My ex-boyfriend is in the House"

Vânia 
Vânia Sá is 21 and comes from Paços de Ferreira. She entered the house on Day 8 and was evicted on Day 43.
 Secret: "I see dead people"

Vítor 
Vítor Dias is 20 and comes from Boticas. He entered the house on Day 1 and was evicted on Day 3.
 Secret: "I was involved with the husband/wife of my best friend"

Secrets 
There are 21 secrets in the House for the fifth season.

Notes

 Bruno's group (Bruno, Flávia, Agnes, Pedro, Cristiana and Elisabete) received a clue from Odin's secret. On Day 64, live in the Gala, they pressed the red button. They guessed right and the money was split between all the members of the group.
 Odin's group (Odin, Daniela, Daniel, Liliana, Fernando and Ricardo) received a clue from Agnes' secret. On Day 64, live in the Gala, they pressed the red button. They guessed right and the money was split between all the members of the group.
 Instead of receiving Flávia's money, Daniel & Liliana didn't receive any. This was because Flávia gave obvious clues about her secret to them. She also lost all her money.
 "A Voz" gave a clue about Cristiana's secret and then gave the opportunity to press the red button for the first who went to the Diary Room. Pedro arrived first, Agnes second and Flávia third. Then, "A Voz" asked them what they wanted to do, and they decided to press the red button together. Therefore, Cristiana's money was split between the three.

Notes 
 : All males housemates were automatically nominated.
 : Daniela and Elisabete are immune as new housemates.
 : For this nominations, the males nominated two females in the Diary Room.
 : Bruno, Daniela and Elisabete were voted as the most hated housemates. As a reward, they won immunity.
 : For this nominations, females nominate male housemates. Nominations in Bold were the first round, done face-to-face. In the second round, each female had to nominate 2 males.
 : Odin won immunity, after accepting a dilemma from "A Voz".
 : Agnes won immunity, and received the power to remove the immunity of either Elisabete or Daniela. She decided to take Daniela's immunity away.
 : Cristiana had a dilemma. Choosing to give time for Pedro to talk to his mother or give him immunity. Cristiana decided to give Pedro a time to speak to his mother by a phone call. "A Voz" decided to offer Cristiana an immunity after the dilemma for her good deed.
 : Fernando had a dilemma. He had to choose between punishment for him or the entire House. He chose the one for himself, and the punishment was that he would be automatically nominated.
 : Hugo was automatically nominated for being the first secret discovered. However, Paulo could swap with him. He decided to do it, so Paulo is automatically nominated.
 : Inês was automatically nominated for revealing details about her and other's secrets.
 : Some ex-housemates (Sofia, Rúben, Marco and Érica) had to give immunity to a girl. They decided to give immunity to Agnes.
 : Some ex-housemates (Joana, Cláudio, Luís and Joana) chose Bruno and Odin as the leaders of the two groups in the house. They decided to give them immunity over them being automatically nominated.
 : For this nominations, the males nominate male housemates in the first round (in bold were done face-to-face). In the second round, the females nominated the males in the Diary Room and the two most voted would be automatically nominated. Hugo received the most votes and as there was a tie between Daniel and Fernando for the second nomination, females had to choose unanimously between them. They chose Fernando.
 : For this nominations, males nominate female housemates in the first round (in Bold were done face-to-face). In the second round, each female had to nominate one female.
 : After the nominations, the housemates voted to save one of them for eviction (Agnes, Cinthia, Daniela or Vânia). Daniela received 4 votes leaving Agnes, Cinthia and Vânia as this week's nominees.
 : As the twist of the Grenade, Vânia (as the last evictee) had to give immunity to someone and automatically nominate someone. She gave immunity to Cristiana and automatically nominated Hugo.
 : For this nominations, males nominate female housemates. In the first round Agnes, Cinthia and Elisabete tied with 2 votes each. Elisabete was nominated by the males in a tiebreaker. Nominations in Bold were done face-to-face both in the first and second rounds.
 : On Day 50 (Sunday gala) the housemates voted to elect who would be the "protagonists" (Cristiana, Daniel, Pedro, Agnes and Liliana) and the "villains" (Bruno and Odin) of the House. The less voted in each category were elected "figurants" (Cinthia, Daniela, Flávia, Elisabete and Ricardo). Some ex-housemates (Carlos, Daniela P., Diogo and Débora) voted to save Fernando from the "figurants". On Day 52, during the live nominations, was informed that the "figurants" were all nominated (excluding Daniela saved by "A Voz") and the remaining housemates should save one of them (Daniela and Fernando couldn't vote). Ricardo received 3 votes leaving Cinthia, Elisabete and Flávia as this week's nominees.
 : On Day 57 (Sunday gala) the housemates were divided into 2 groups: Red Team (Bruno, Agnes, Cinthia, Flávia, Pedro, Cristiana & Elisabete) and Blue Team (Odin, Daniel, Liliana, Ricardo, Fernando & Daniela). They competed in various challenges through the Gala. Bruno and Odin (as leaders) had to choose their right arm. Bruno chose Agnes and Odin chose Daniel. As a reward, they both won immunity for the next nominations. At the end of the night, the Red Team won the challenge and as a reward could choose someone from the Blue Team to not nominate (Liliana).
 : As the twist of the Grenade, Cinthia (as the last evictee) had to give immunity to a girl and automatically nominate a boy. She gave immunity to Cristiana and automatically nominated Fernando.
 : For this nominations, females nominate male housemates. Nominations in Bold were the first round, done face-to-face. In the second round, each female had to nominate another male.
 : Daniela was automatically nominated for serious misconduct against Odin.
 : As the twist of the Grenade, Odin (as the last evictee) had to double someone's nominations and ban someone from nominating. He doubles Fernando's nominations and banned Agnes from nominating.
 : For this nominations, the males nominate female housemates in the first round (in bold were done face-to-face). In the second round, the females nominated the males in the Diary Room.
 : As the twist of the Grenade, Daniela had to double a girl's nominations and Ricardo bans a boy from nomination. Daniela double Cristiana's nominations and banned Pedro from nominating when eligible.
 : For this nominations, only females nominated. In the first round, they nominated a male (in bold were done face-to-face). In the second round, they nominated a female in the Diary Room.
 : Flávia was automatically nominated for revealing details about her secret and for serious misconduct against Bruno.
 : For this nominations, all housemates nominated a female in the Diary Room.
 : For this nominations, all housemates nominated in three rounds. In the first round, Daniel and Elisabete tied with 2 votes each. In the tiebreaker, Daniel became the first nominee. In the second round, Bruno and Elisabete tied with 2 votes each. In the tiebreaker, Bruno became the second nominee. In the third round, Elisabete received 4 votes and became the third nominee.
 : This week there were no nominations and all housemates are up for eviction. It is also a vote to save rather than evict.
 : Only the percentages of the two less voted was revealed to not influence the public in their final decision.

Nominations: Results

Nominations totals received

Twists

Houseguests

Fake nominations 
On Day 2, each girl had to fake nominate a boy. The nomination was done face-to-face. Vítor would have been nominated if the nominations were real.

On Day 17, Agnes, Cristiana, Elisabete and Vânia (who were immune) had to fake nominate a girl as a group in the Diary Room. They decided to nominate Daniela.

On Day 24, boys had to fake nominate a girl face-to-face for a supposed third round. Agnes couldn't be nominated as she was immune and Inês, Vânia and Elisabete couldn't be nominated as they were already nominated. Cinthia would have been nominated if it was real.

On Day 31, each boy had to fake nominate a girl face-to-face. In the end, there was a tie between Vânia, Elisabete, Liliana and Agnes. As the 2 leaders, Bruno and Odin had to break the tie. They decided to nominate Vânia and Liliana. On Day 36, Teresa told the house that Vânia and Liliana were "nominated" in a separate vote and one of them would be evicted. Liliana was fake evicted then and moved to the Secret Room until Day 38 where she re-entered the House after the nominations.

On Day 40, the nominees (Agnes, Cinthia and Vânia) had to choose someone to be their pair for eviction, so if they were evicted their pair would be also. Agnes chose Odin, Cinthia chose Fernando and Vânia chose Pedro. However, this was fake. On Day 43, when Vânia was evicted, Pedro also went to the studio being fake evicted. However, Teresa told him that he was not evicted and could return to the House.

Fake eviction 
On Day 11, the boys had to fake evict a girl. Each boy voted to evict a girl. Daniela, Elisabete and Vânia were immune from this vote. Agnes received the most votes and was fake evicted. She moved to the Secret Room for one day, and she re-entered the Main House on Day 12.

Vote to save 
On Day 38, Vânia, Agnes, Daniela and Cinthia were initially nominated. However, the other housemates (exempt Liliana) had to vote to save one of them in the Diary Room. Daniela received the most votes and was saved.

On Day 45, each girl had to vote for a boy in the Diary Room for who they wanted to give immunity. They couldn't vote for Hugo as he was already nominated at the time. Bruno received the most votes and received immunity for the next boys' nominations.

Grenade 
Starting after Vânia's eviction, each evicted housemate would go to the next afternoon diary and have the Grenade power: he/she had to choose someone to have a good consequence and another to have a bad one.
 On Day 44, Vânia had the first Grenade: the good consequence was to give immunity to someone and the bad consequence was to automatically nominate someone.
 On Day 51, Hugo had the second Grenade: the good consequence was to choose someone to receive a clue from a secret and the bad consequence was to choose someone to lose half of his/her money.
 On Day 58, Cinthia had the third Grenade: the good consequence was to give immunity to a girl and the bad consequence was to automatically nominate a boy.
 On Day 65, Odin had the fourth Grenade: the good consequence was to double the nomination of a housemate and the bad consequence was to ban a housemate from nominating.
 On Day 72, Daniela and Ricardo had the fifth Grenade: the good consequence (for Daniela) was to double the nomination of a girl and the bad consequence (for Ricardo) was to ban a boy from nominating.
 On Day 79, Fernando had the sixth and last Grenade: the good consequence was to choose a housemate to win all money from Fernando's account and the bad consequence was to choose a housemate to lose all his/her money.

Fake pass 
On Day 86, housemates voted for who should win a pass to the finale, Liliana could also vote as she was the last evictee. Unknown to them it was fake, and it was only revealed at the nominations show at the next day. If it was real, Flávia would have been the first finalist of the season.

Ratings and Reception

Live Eviction Shows 
The Live Eviction show on every Sunday.

 : Eviction #1 took place on a Tuesday instead of a Sunday when the usual eviction gala takes place.
 : The last eviction took place on Thursday, Christmas Day instead of Sunday when the usual eviction gala takes place.

References

External links
 Official Website 
 Fan Website 

2014 Portuguese television seasons
05